Mimomenyllus is a genus of longhorn beetles of the subfamily Lamiinae, containing the following species:

 Mimomenyllus aruensis Breuning, 1973
 Mimomenyllus ochreithorax Breuning, 1978
 Mimomenyllus quadricostulatus Breuning, 1980

References

Pteropliini